Tiruvaciriyam is a compilation of hymns written by Nammalvar, one of the Alvars, the poet-saints of the Tamil Vaishnava tradition. This work, which is a part of the Naalayira Divya Prabandham, consists of seven hymns referred to as pasurams, dedicated to the praise of the Hindu preserver deity, Vishnu. It is often regarded to contain the essence of the Yajur Veda.

Hymns 

The first hymn of the work describes Vishnu reclining upon his serpent-mount, Shesha, extolled as a deity without equal:

See also 

 Tirumālai
 Periya Tirumoli
 Tiruvaymoli

References

External links 
 Tiruvaciriyam

Naalayira Divya Prabandham
Vaishnava texts
Tamil Hindu literature